Xifan is the atonal pinyin romanization of various Chinese names and words.

It may refer to:

 Xifan or Hsi-fan (. "The Western Barbarians"), a Chinese racial slur variously used for
 Native peoples west of Gansu under the Tang
 The Qiang and other Qiangic speakers
 Their homelands west of Sichuan and Yunnan
 The Tibetans
 Tibet, particularly eastern Tibet
 xifan, a Chinese synonym for congee